Southeast Peninsula may refer to:

Southeast Peninsula, Sulawesi
Southeast Peninsula (Saint Kitts)